Shin Jae-hwi is a South Korean actor. He is known for his roles in dramas such as Class of Lies, The Good Detective, XX, Nobody Knows, True Beauty and All of Us Are Dead. He also appeared in movie More Than Family as Jang Do-hoon.

Filmography

Television series

Film

Music video appearances

Theatre

References

External links 
 
 

1994 births
Living people
21st-century South Korean male actors
South Korean male television actors
South Korean male film actors